Central European Tour Budapest GP was a cycling race in Hungary. It was first run in 2011 and was part of the UCI Europe Tour as a 1.2 level race. It was held the day after Central European Tour Miskolc GP.

Past winners

External links

Cycle races in Hungary
Recurring sporting events established in 2011
UCI Europe Tour races
2011 establishments in Hungary
Sport in Budapest
Summer events in Hungary